Kalinga Lancers (abbreviated as KAL) is a field hockey team based in Bhubaneswar, Odisha that plays in the Hockey India League. It is jointly owned by Odisha Industrial Infrastructure Development Corporation (IDCO) and Mahanadi Coalfield Limited (MCL). Former Australian field player Mark Hager is the head coach of the team while former Indian captain Dilip Tirkey is the chief mentor and advisor of the team.

Ownership
Kalinga Lancers is owned by Odisha Sports Development and Promotion Company jointly formed by Odisha Industrial Infrastructure Development Corporation (IDCO) and Mahanadi Coalfield Limited (MCL).

Squad

Statistics

2014

 Goals For: 23 (2.30 per match)
 Goals Against: 34 (3.40 per match)
 Most Goals: 8
 Gonzalo Peillat

2015

 Goals For: 17 (1.70 per match)
 Goals Against: 26 (2.60 per match)
 Most Goals: 3
  Gurjinder Singh

2016
In the auction held in 2015, Kalinga Lancers paid the highest price for German national Moritz Fuerste who is also the captain for the 2016 season. The Lancers qualified for the play-offs edging out Dabang Mumbai on basis of goal difference. In the second semifinal played against Ranchi Rays, popularly known as the East India Derby, Lancers prevailed over Rays and qualified to finals defeating Ranchi Rays 4-2 in shootout after match was tied at 2-2 at the end of regular time. In the final held at Ranchi on 21 January, Lancers lost 6-1 to Jaypee Punjab Warriors.

 Goals For: 46 (3.84 per match)
 Goals Against: 46 (3.84 per match)
 Most Goals: 16
  Glenn Turner

2017

 Goals For: 39 (3.25 per match)
 Goals Against: 41 (3.41 per match)
 Most Goals: 12
  Glenn Turner
  Moritz Fürste

See also 
 Hockey India League
 2017 Hockey India League season

References 

Hockey India League teams
Indian field hockey clubs
2013 establishments in Odisha
Field hockey in Odisha
Sports clubs established in 2013